Susan Powers (born 1954 in Glen Cove, New York) is a self-taught American artist.

Education 
Powers attended the University of Vermont, where she studied classical languages and medieval history, graduating in 1976 with a Bachelor of Arts degree in European Studies.

Career 
Powers began painting in 1979, encouraged by a friend and fellow painter who had seen her expressive pencil drawings. Only a year later, her work had been accepted for display by the prestigious Jay Johnson Folk Heritage Gallery in New York City. In 1980, Powers spent a year in England and France developing her craft, before returning to the U.S.

The folk art still lifes of Susan Powers have been compared with the trompe-l'œil works of the well-known 19th-century American academic artist William Harnett. Like Harnett, Powers is fascinated with common everyday objects — books, seashells, bottles, and teapots — and she renders them in a manner so lifelike they ‘fool the eye’ of the viewer, almost leading the viewer to believe that the objects themselves are present on the canvas. The trompe-l'œil technique is uncommon with folk artists: some folk artists cannot produce a photograph-like image.

Her paintings are in many permanent collections, including the Smithsonian Institution in Washington, D.C. and the American Museum in Bath, England. Her works have been exhibited in numerous museums, including the Bede Gallery, Jarrow, England, the Woodspring Museum, Weston-super-Mare, England, the Camden Arts Center, London, the Haworth Art Gallery, London, and at the White House in Washington, D.C.

Artwork

” The still lifes of Susan Powers have been compared with the trompe-l'œil works of the well-known 19th–century American academic artist William Harnett. Like Harnett, Powers is fascinated with common everyday objects — books seashells, bottles, and teapots — and she renders them in a manner so lifelike they ‘fool the eye’ of the viewer, almost leading the viewer to believe that the objects themselves are present on the canvas. The trompe-l'œil technique is uncommon with folk artists: some folk artists cannot produce a photograph-like image...”

American Folk Art of the Twentieth Century
Jay Johnson & William C. Ketchum, Jr.
(Rizzoli International, New York, NY 1983)

References

Additional sources 
 Johnson, Jay & Ketchum, William, American Folk Art of the Twentieth Century. Rizzoli International: 1983. .

External links
 Artist's Web Site
 Haworth Art Gallery, London

American artists
Living people
1954 births
University of Vermont alumni
People from Glen Cove, New York